Haimbachia maroniella is a moth in the family Crambidae. It was described by Harrison Gray Dyar Jr. and Carl Heinrich in 1927. It is found in French Guiana.

References

Haimbachiini
Moths described in 1927